Aksyonovshchina is a rural locality (a village) in Yenangskoye Rural Settlement, Kichmengsko-Gorodetsky District, Vologda Oblast, Russia. The population was 11 as of 2002.

Geography 
Aksyonovshchina is located 55 km east of Kichmengsky Gorodok (the district's administrative centre) by road. Zasorino is the nearest rural locality.

References 

Rural localities in Kichmengsko-Gorodetsky District